Reza Mirkarimi (born 27 January 1967) is an Iranian screenwriter and film director.

He was also Secretary of the International Film Festival of the Fajr Film Festival.

Career
He graduated from Fine Arts University in graphic arts in Tehran. His cinema activities started from 1987 with a short film named For Him (16mm camera) and with a series of shorts followed by two TV series aimed at young people. His 1999 first feature, The Child and The Soldier, has won several national and international awards, including the ”Golden Butterfly” at the 1999 Isfahan International Children and Youth Film Festival, Iran and the "Montgolfiere d'Argent” at the Festival of 3 Continents, Nantes, France, in 2000, as well as the "Golden Shoe" at the "Children and Teenagers Film Festival" in Zelin, Croatia, in 2001. The Child and The Soldier, was released in France in 2001. In 2000, his second feature, Under the Moonlight, dealing with social and religious issues won the Best Feature Award at the 40th Critics' Week at the 2001 Cannes International Film Festival. The film also won the Best Director's Award as well as the Special Jury Prize at the Tokyo IFF in 2001, and the Golden Peacock Award at the International Film Festival of India. His fourth and fifth feature films, As Simple as That (2007) and Daughter (2016), won the Golden George Award for the Best Picture at the 30th and the 38th Moscow International Film Festival respectively. He also contributes to young Iranian directors by producing their films. He has produced Don't be Tired in 2012 and Voice of Silence in 2013. His latest film, Castle of Dreams (2019), won big at Shanghai International Film Festival, receiving three awards for the best picture, the best director, and the best actor. Mirkarimi has so far won seven Golden Simorgh awards at the Fajr International Film Festival. Three of his films have been presented by Iran for the Best Foreign Language Film Oscar: So Close, So Far, A Cube of Sugar, and  Today. He has also sat on several international film festival juries, including Black Nights Film Festival (Estonia), Tokyo International Film Festival (Japan), Carthage Film Festival (Tunisia), Bogota International Film Festival (Colombia), Golden Apricot – Yerevan International Film Festival (Armenia), and as jury president at the 39th Moscow International Film Festival. He has also served as managing director of Khane-ye Cinema (Iranian Alliance of Motion Picture Guilds). Reza Mirkarimi has been director of Fajr International Film Festival for four consecutive years from 2016 to 2019.

Filmography

Short Film
 Baraye Ou (For Him) - 1987
 Yek Rooze Barani (A Rainy Day) - 1987
 Khoroos (Rooster) - 1987

Documentary
 Iranian Carpet - 2006

Tv Series
 Majara-haye Aftaab va Aziz Khanoom (The Tales of Aftaab and Lady Aziz) - 1996
 Bache-haye Madreseye Hemmat (Hemmat School Kids) - 1997

Accolades
In 2021 he was selected as Jury Chairman for Kim Jiseok Award in 26th Busan International Film Festival to be held in October.

Awards

 2019 - Golden Goblet Award for Best Feature Film Shanghai International Film Festival 
 2019 - Golden Goblet Award for Best Director Shanghai International Film Festival 2019
 2019 - Best Director Antalya Golden Orange Film Festival

See also
Iranian cinema

References

External links

Official Website

Reza Mirkarimi at Iranactor.com

Iranian film directors
Crystal Simorgh for Best Director winners
People from Tehran
1967 births
Living people
Producers who won the Best Film Crystal Simorgh
Crystal Simorgh for Best Screenplay winners